The Grammy Award for Best Female Country Vocal Performance was first awarded in 1965, to Dottie West. The award has had several minor name changes:

From 1965 to 1967 the award was known as Best Country & Western Vocal Performance - Female
In 1968 it was awarded as Best Country & Western Solo Vocal Performance, Female
From 1969 to 1994 it was awarded as Best Country Vocal Performance, Female
From 1995 to 2011 it was awarded as Best Female Country Vocal Performance

The award was discontinued after 2011 award season in a major overhaul of Grammy categories. From 2012 to the present, all solo performances (male, female and instrumental) in the country category are recognized in the newly formed Best Country Solo Performance category.

Years reflect the year in which the Grammy Awards were presented, for works released in the previous year.

Recipients

Multiple wins
The following individuals received two or more wins in this category:

Multiple nominations
The following individuals received two or more nominations in this category:
{| class="wikitable" rowspan=2 border="1" cellpadding="4" style="text-align: center; background: #f6e39c"
|-
! scope="col" width="55" | Nominations
! scope="col" align="center" | Performer
|-
| scope="row"  rowspan=2 style="text-align:center" | 18
|Dolly Parton
|-
|Emmylou Harris
|-
| scope="row"  rowspan=1 style="text-align:center" | 10
|Trisha Yearwood
|-
| scope="row"  rowspan=2 style="text-align:center" | 9
|Martina McBride
|-
|Tammy Wynette
|-
| scope="row"  rowspan=1 style="text-align:center" | 8
|Crystal Gayle
|-
| scope="row"  rowspan=2 style="text-align:center" | 7
|Dottie West
|-
|Reba McEntire
|-
| scope="row"  rowspan=4 style="text-align:center" | 6
|LeAnn Rimes
|-
|Lee Ann Womack
|-
|Mary Chapin Carpenter
|-
|Tanya Tucker
|-
| scope="row"  rowspan=7 style="text-align:center" | 5
|Alison Krauss
|-
|Anne Murray
|-
|Barbara Mandrell 
|-
|Carrie Underwood
|-
|Faith Hill 
|-
|Rosanne Cash 
|-
|Shania Twain 
|-
| scope="row"  rowspan=8 style="text-align:center" | 4
|Connie Smith
|-
|Gretchen Wilson
|-
|Kathy Mattea 
|-
|Loretta Lynn 
|-
|Lynn Anderson
|-
|Miranda Lambert 
|-
|Patty Loveless 
|-
|Skeeter Davis
|-
| scope="row"  rowspan=5 style="text-align:center" | 3
|Janie Fricke
|-
|Juice Newton
|-
|K. T. Oslin
|-
|Pam Tillis
|-
|Wynonna Judd
|-
| scope="row"  rowspan=8 style="text-align:center" | 2
|Deana Carter 
|-
|Jan Howard
|-
|Jean Shepard
|-
|Jeannie C. Riley
|-
|Jody Miller
|-
|k.d. lang
|-
|Lucinda Williams 
|-
|Wanda Jackson
|-

Grammy Award categories
Grammy Awards for country music
Music awards honoring women